The Movement for the People's Alternative  (Mouvement pour une Alternative du Peuple) is a political party of Benin led by Lazare Sèhouéto. 
The party won at the presidential election of 5 March 2006 2% of the votes for its candidate Lazare Sèhouéto. 

Political parties in Benin
Political parties with year of establishment missing